is a Japanese politician who served as Minister for Foreign Affairs from 2011 to 2012. He is a member of the House of Representatives in the Diet, and was a member to the Democratic Party of Japan and its successor Democratic Party until its merger in 2018. He left the party briefly before the merger, and joined the Group of Independents House of Representatives caucus of other former Democrats a few days later. A native of Tamura, Fukushima and graduate of Sophia University, he was later accepted into the prestigious Matsushita Institute of Government and Management, an institution founded by Panasonic founder Konosuke Matsushita which grooms future civic leaders of Japan. Genba was elected to the House of Representatives for the first time in 1993 after serving in the assembly of Fukushima Prefecture for one term. In September 2011 he was chosen as Minister for Foreign Affairs in the cabinet of Prime Minister Yoshihiko Noda.

References

External links 
  in Japanese.
 Minister for National Policy, Minister of State for the New Public Commons, Minister of State for Science and Technology Policy, Minister for Space Policy

|-

|-

|-

|-

|-

|-

|-

|-

|-

1964 births
Living people
Anti-Korean sentiment in Japan
Sophia University alumni
Democratic Party of Japan politicians
Foreign ministers of Japan
Government ministers of Japan
Members of the House of Representatives (Japan)
21st-century Japanese politicians